Mo Fan (莫凡 Hangzhou, May 1949) is a Chinese composer. During the Cultural Revolution he was sent to Heilongjiang, where he taught himself composition. In 1979 he entered Shanghai Conservatory.

Works
 Thunderstorm.
 Pipa concerto - Changhen ge "Ballad of the Eternal Sorrow" - for soprano, pipa, flute and orchestra 1991

Selected recordings
 "Waterscape Silhouette" piao 《漂》 - for pipa on recital by UK Chinese ensemble The Silk String Quartet - Contemporary and Traditional Chinese Music ARC Music 2007

References

1949 births
Chinese male composers
Living people
Musicians from Hangzhou
Shanghai Conservatory of Music alumni
Chinese composers